Globuliciopsis is a genus of two species of crust fungi in the order Polyporales that are found in Central and South America.

Taxonomy
The genus was circumscribed by mycologists Kurt Hjortstam and Leif Ryvarden in 2004 to contain the type, Globuliciopsis fuegiana. This fungus was found originally collected in Tierra del Fuego National Park, Argentina. The Costa Rican species G. lindbladii was added to the genus by these authors in 2007. Globuliciopsis is of uncertain familial placement in the Polyporales.

Description
The fruit bodies of Globuliciopsis are pale brown, thick crusts that adhere closely to their substrates. The spore-bearing surface is smooth, while the subiculum is compact with a brownish colour. Globuliciopsis has a monomitic hyphal system (containing only generative hyphae), and the hyphae are hyaline (translucent) and lack clamp connections. Cystidia are absent from the hymenium, but there are hyphal ends and dendrohyphidia. The basidia (spore-bearing cells) are arranged in a relatively loose palisade, measuring up to 100 µm long. They usually have two, but sometimes three to four sterigmata. Spores are roughly spherical, smooth, hyaline, and feature a slight wall thickening. They are somewhat cyanophilous, but do not react with Melzer's reagent.

References

Polyporales genera
Taxa named by Leif Ryvarden
Taxa described in 2004